The San Jose City National High School is a public secondary school in San Jose, Nueva Ecija, Philippines, was established in 1944 with 321 students enrolled and with only a few teachers. Classes in those times were held in makeshift rooms constructed of bamboo and talahib. Other classes were conducted in unoccupied first floors of residential homes. Through the cooperative efforts of the Parents Teachers Association (PTA) and the community, an eight hectare lot was acquired and purchased through funds they were able to raise. Quonset huts made of cogon used by the Americans as barracks were used as temporary rooms. A warehouse made of sawali (woven split bamboo mats) and GI sheets inside the campus was also converted into classrooms.

The school was formerly named North Provincial High School and later Constancio Padilla National High School, when the town of San Jose was converted into a chartered city on August 10, 1969, the North Provincial High School became San Jose City High School. By virtue of Batas Pambansa Bilang 261 authored by Assemblyman Narciso S. Nario, the school was nationalized and named San Jose City National High School which was approved on November 13, 1982. The following year, Assemblyman Leopoldo Diaz passed a Bill Batas Pambansa Bilang 650 changing its name to Constancio Padilla National High School. This is the name that is still used up to the present. in honor of Constancio Padilla, former congressman of Nueva Ecija and a member of the First Congress of the Republic of the Philippines. It has the Sections of (STE) Science Technology and Engineering, Special Program in the Art (SPA), and Regular Classes, it also has the Special Program in Foreign Language (SPFL) and Special Program in Journalism (SPJ).

History
Constancio Padilla National High School was established in 1944. Classes were held in makeshift classrooms constructed of bamboo and talahib. Other classes were conducted in unoccupied first floors of residential homes. Through the cooperative efforts of the parents, teachers and the community, an eight hectare lot was acquired and purchased through funds they were able to raise. Quonset huts made of cogon used by the Americans as barracks were used as temporary rooms. A warehouse made of sawali and GI sheets inside the campus was converted into classrooms.

When the school was founded, it was named North Provincial High School. When the town was converted into a chartered City, it became San Jose City High School. By virtue of B.P. Blg. 261 authored by Assemblyman Narciso Nario, the school was nationalized and named San Jose City National High School which was approved on November 13, 1982. The following year, Assemblyman Leopoldo Diaz passed another Bill changing its name to Constancio Padilla National High School which is still being used up to the present.

A tremendous facelift was made in the early 1990s. Many buildings were erected through the efforts of the school officials. Buildings were given by the national government through the efforts of alumni members who became a national figure. The rest were donated by the local government and foreign grants.

Community linkages
The school works harmoniously with the officials of the local government and the NGO's. The Sangguniang Panglungsod passed an Ordinance through the DENR requiring the graduating students to plant at least 6 seedling/trees in a designated area. Student government participate in the activities of the city during the observance of Linggo ng Kabataan where the students are given the chance to experience running the government.

CPNHS also enjoins the PTA in the school programs. PTA serves as the partner of the school in the realization of the school's programs and projects. Aside from the Parent Teachers Association, the school also received support from the barangay and Local Government Unit (LGU). They play a great role in the educational needs of today's youth through their financial and package grants for the school's growing population.

Another partner of the school is the alumni association. They organized homecoming, donated projects like school buildings and other facilities and pledges support in all undertakings.

Community relations
Cleanliness and beautification campaigns
Tree planting programs supported by the school.
Boy/Girl City Officials during Linggo ng Kabataan
Sports tournament participated by students and out-of-school youth.
Citizens Drug Watch – campaign for anti-drug abuse monitored by the local government
SADAC (School Anti-Drug Abuse Campaign) and CADAC (City Anti-Drug Abuse Campaign) are organized by the students in support to the government's drive on anti-drug abuse.
Library is open to the community (School library is also called Community Library)

Special programs
Remedial classes for the non-readers and non-numerates
Supreme Student Government – Students exercise suffrage and elect the officers through secret ballot on election days. Student government run the student affairs.
School Journalism – seminars and in-service training are conducted to select the staffers of the School paper – The Grain – and to participate in the school conference.
Clubs in different subjects/learning areas. Students are encouraged to exercise leadership.
Subject are competitions – each department conducts symposia, contests prescribed by the Department of Education to select school representatives in the higher levels.
Scouting – Boys and Girls scouts are given the opportunity to join the scouts movement to augment character building programs.
Athletics – Intramurals, City, Congressional and Divisional Meets, etc. are participated by the students.
Convocations – held on special holidays with guest speakers to highlight the occasion.
Implementation of government trusts.
Teachers sportsfest sponsored by the Faculty & Staff Club of the school.

Curricular programs
Language
English and Filipino
Study of Society
Social Studies
Math, Science & Technology
Mathematics
Biology
Physics
Chemistry
Technology & Livelihood Education
Personal Development
Values Education
Physical Education
Health and Music

References

High schools in Nueva Ecija
San Jose, Nueva Ecija